This is a non-exhaustive list of French-language television series from Canada. Most such television series are produced in Quebec, although a small number are also produced elsewhere in Canada. Series produced outside Quebec are noted below with a †.

For English Canadian series, see list of English-language Canadian television series.

0-9
 100 limites
 14, rue de Galais - drama
 19-2 - drama
 2 laits, un sucre - talk show
 450, Chemin du Golf - sitcom
 60 second chorno - game show

A
 À cause de mon oncle - comedy
 À la Di Stasio - cooking
 À table avec mon ex! - reality
 Action Réaction - game show
 Ad Lib - talk / comedy / variety
 L'Âge adulte - comedy-drama
 L'Amour est dans le pré
 Appelez-moi Lise
 Après OD - reality aftershow
 L'Arbitre - judge show
 Atomes Crochus - licensed French-language version of RTL's Match Game
 L'Attaque à 5 - sports news
 Aventures en nord
 Au secours de Béatrice
 Automania
 Aux frontières de l'inexpliqué - paranormal / documentary
  - comedy
 Avec un grand A - drama
 Les Aventures de Virulysse - children's

B
 La Bande des Six
 BANDEÀPART.tv
 Le Banquier - licensed French-language version of Endemol's Deal or No Deal
 Les Beaux Dimanches
 Les Belles Histoires des pays d'en haut - téléroman
 Bibi et Geneviève
 Bleu Nuit - adult
 Les Bleus de Ramville † - sitcom
 Bob Gratton: Ma Vie, My Life - comedy (2007-2009)
 Bobino
 Bon Baisers de France
 Les Bougon - satirical comedy (2004-2006)
 Les Brillant
 Bye Bye - sketch comedy
 Le Bachelor - reality
 Big Brother - reality
 Blindés
 Bob Gratton : Ma Vie, My Life - comedy
 Les Bolés
 Bootcamp: Le parcours extrême
 Box-office

C
 Ca fait la job - game show
 Caméra Café - comedy
 Catherine - sitcom
 Les Cents tours de Centour
 C'est comme ça que je t'aime - crime comedy
 Chambres en ville - soap opera (1989-1996)
 Chanteurs masqués - reality (2021)
 Chop Suey - TV Series (1986–1994)
 Ciel, mon Pinard! - cooking
 Le Cimetière des CD - music critic show
 Claire Lamarche - panel talk show
 Le Club des 100 Watts (1988–94)
 Le coeur a ses raisons - comedy soap opera parody (2005-2007)
 Comme dans l'espace - children's educational series 
 Contact, l'encyclopédie de la création - documentary
 Cornemuse
 Les Coulisses du pouvoir - news
 Cover Girl - comedy
 Cré Basile - comedy

D
 Les Dames de coeur - drama
 Dans une galaxie près de chez-vous - comedy / science fiction (1998-2001)
 Défi Mini Putt
 Discussions avec mes parents - comedy
 District 31 - drama
 Donnez au suivant
 Droit de Parole
 Dumont 360 - news
 Duplessis - historical drama
 Dutrizac - news

E 
Entre chien et loup
Entre deux draps
Escouade 99 - comedy
Et Dieu créa... Laflaque - comedy
L'été indien - talk-show

F
 Fanfreluche
 Félix et Ciboulette
 Les Filles de Caleb (1990–91)
 La Fin du monde est à 7 heures - satirical / sketch comedy (1997-2000) 
 Fortier
 Les Franc-Tireurs - information / comedy
 Francoeur † - drama
 Le Fric Show - satirical news/variety
 Fugueuse - drama
 La Fureur - quiz / music

G
 Un gars, une fille - sketch comedy (1997-2003)
 Go Diego!
 Génies en herbe - quiz
 Le Grand Blond avec un show sournois - talk / comedy / variety (2001-2003)
 Grande Ourse
 Grosse Vie
 La Guerre des clans - licensed version of RTL's Family Feud

H
 Les hauts et les bas de Sophie Paquin
 L'Héritage
 Les Héritiers Duval

I
 Iniminimagimo
 Les Invincibles

J
 Jamais deux sans toi
 Jasmine
 JE - news
 Jean Duceppe
 Jeunesse d'aujourd'hui
 La Job - Quebec adaptation of the British-originated comedy The Office
 Gags Juste pour rire - comedy
 Le Gala Juste pour rire - comedy

K
 Kif-Kif - teen 
 km/h - sitcom

L
 Lâcher prise - comedy
 Lance et compte - hockey drama (1986-)
 Le sens du punch - comedy
 Loft Story - reality
 Like-moi! - sketch comedy

M
 Macaroni tout garni - children's
 La Maison-Bleue - sitcom
 Maman Dion - cooking
 Manon
 Marie-Soleil † - children's
 Méga TFO † - children's
 Mégantic - drama
 Mémoires Vives
 Mensonges
 Météo+ † - sitcom
 Michaëlle - talkshow
Mike Ward Show - comedy
 Milena Nova Tremblay
 Minibus
 Minuit, le soir 
 Minute moumoutte - children's
 Mix Sonore - bilingual musical variety
 Moi et l'autre - sitcom
 Un monde à part
 Le monde de Charlotte
 Monsieur le ministre
 Monsieur Tranquille
 Montréal, ville ouverte - part non-fiction

N
 Le National d'impro - improvisational comedy
 Nic et Pic
 Le nouveau show - sketch comedy
 Nouvelle adresse - drama
 La nuit où Laurier Gaudreault s'est réveillé - thriller drama

O
 Occupation Double - reality
 Omertà (1996-1999)
 L'or du temps
 Les Oraliens

P
 Paquet voleur - game show
 Le parc des braves
 Les Parent
 Parlez-Moi † - children's 
 Passe-Partout - children's (1977–87)
 Patofville - children's 
 Paul, Marie et les enfants Les Pays d'en haut - drama (2016-21)
 Peau de banane Pépino et Capucine La Petite Vie - sitcom (1993-1999)
 Pignon sur rue Piment Fort (1993-2001)
 Les Plouffe Le Point - news
 Point de Mire - news / information
 Pokémon - anime (1998–present) (French dubbed)
 ProvidenceQ
 Quatre coins de l'assiette - documentary - gourmet cooking
R
 R-Force - children / teens
 Radisson - adventure
 Ramdam - children / teens
 Réal-TV - children / teens
 RelieF † - newsmagazine
 René Lévesque (1994)
 René Lévesque (2006)
 Les Rescapés Ricardo - cooking (2002-present)
 Robin et Stella (1988–92)
 Rock et Belles Oreilles - sketch comedy 
 La Roue Chanceuse - game show
 Rue des Pignons Rumeurs - sitcom

S
 St. Nickel † - comedy
 Samedi de rire - sketch comedy (1985-1989)
 Scoop - téléroman 
 La semaine des 4 Julie - talk show (2020) 
 Série noire - crime comedy-drama
 Simmone et Chartrand - historical drama
 SNL Québec - sketch comedy
 Soeur Angèle - cooking
 Les Soeurs Elliot - drama
 La Soirée du hockey - sports
 Sol et Gobelet - children's
 Sortez-moi de moi - thriller drama
 La Souris verte - children's
 Sous le signe du lion - drama
 Star Académie - licensed version of Endemol franchise Operacion Triunfo (Star Academy)
 Station X - drama/animated

T
 Tactik - children / teens
 Tape-Tambour - children's
 Taquinons la planète - satirical / sketch comedy
 Taxi 0-22 - sitcom
 Téléfrançais! † - children's
 Le Téléjournal - news / information
 Le Temps d'une paix Terre humaine Les Tisserands du pouvoir Toi & Moi Le tournoi de mètres - game show
 Tous contre un - game show
 Tout le monde en parle - talk show (2004-)
 Toute la vérité Le Traboulidon - children's
 Trajectoires - documentary - retired NHL players
 Le travail à la chaine  -  game show
 Trauma - medical drama
 Le TVA 22 heures - news

U
 Ultimatum L'Union fait la farce - original licensed French-language version of RTL's Match Game L'union fait la force - word games / quiz
 Unité 9V
 Vertige - drama
 La Vie, la vie Viens voir les comédiens Virginie - drama
 Volt † - youth news and culture magazine
 Les Voyages du tortillardW
 Walter et Tandoori - children's/animated
 Watatatow - children / teens (1991-2005)
 Wipeout Quebec'' - game show

See also 
 Culture of Quebec
 List of Quebec media
 List of Quebec movies
 List of French television series
 List of Quebec television series imports and exports
 Television of Quebec

Canada French
Television series, List of Quebec

Lists of Canadian television series
Canadian television-related lists